A pan trap is a type of insect trap used to sample the abundance and diversity of insects, primarily used to capture small Hymenoptera. Pan traps are typically constructed with a bowl with shallow sides filled with water and soap or a preservative and killing agent. Yellow is the most commonly used color, but other colors including blue, white, and red are used to target different insect species.

Trap construction 
A pan trap consists of a shallow bowl, typically made of colored plastic, filled with soapy water, salt, propylene glycol, antifreeze, or combinations of other preservatives and killing agents. Salt and propylene glycol are sometimes included as preservatives or to reduce evaporative water loss. Insects fly into the soapy water and are unable to escape and are preserved in the water for research usage. Some traps have been mounted on trees to sample the communities of parasitoid wasps of the invasive beetle, Emerald ash borer.

Colors 
The color of pan traps attracts diverse groups of flying insects. Some pollinators confuse the traps with natural flowers, causing the capture of flying pollinator species, including bees. Some studies have suggested that bee species are more attracted and likely to be captured in blue or white pans compared to yellow pans. However, yellow and white pan traps consistently collect the largest number of species.

References 

Pest trapping
Entomology equipment